{{Automatic_taxobox
| image = Brown coral blenny (Atrosalarias fuscus) (40577920775).jpg
| image_caption = Atrosalarias fuscus
| taxon = Atrosalarias
| authority = Whitley, 1933 
| type_species = Salarias phaiosoma
| type_species_authority = Bleeker, 1855<ref name = CoF>{{Cof record|genid=5817|title=Atrosalarias|access-date=26 February 2019}}</ref>
}}Atrosalarias is a genus of combtooth blennies found in the western Pacific Ocean and western Indian Ocean.

Species
There are currently three recognized species in this genus:
 Atrosalarias fuscus (Rüppell, 1838)
 Atrosalarias holomelas (Günther, 1872) (Brown coral blenny)
 Atrosalarias hosokawai'' T. Suzuki & Senou, 1999

References

 
Salarinae